Kristen Santos-Griswold (born November 2, 1994) is an American short-track speed skater.

Biography
Santos started figure skating at the age of three and became interested in short-track speed skating when she saw a television commercial featuring Dutch short-track speed skater Wilma Boomstra, who later became her coach. She started the sport at the age of nine in her hometown of Fairfield, Connecticut. After high school, she moved to Salt Lake City to combine her sport with a degree in kinesiology at the University of Utah.

Santos entered her first professional competition in 2013 and entered the US Olympic qualifying tournament in early 2014 but failed to qualify for the 2014 Winter Olympics in Russia. In 2015, she participated in her first World Cup. In Dresden, she raced the 500 and 1500 meters and placed 32nd and 28th, respectively. A few days later, she took part in the 2015 Winter Universiade for the United States. In February 2019, Santos was on the podium for the first time in the World Cup. With the mixed relay team, Santos, Aaron Tran, Jonathan So, and Maame Biney won bronze in Turin. Later that year, she became American champion in the 1000 and 1500 meters and therefore also won the all-round classification. In the 2019-20 season, she won her first individual medal in the World Cup: bronze in Nagoya in the 1000 meters. She also won bronze that season with the relay team (Santos, Biney, Julie Letai, and Corinne Stoddard) in Shanghai.

Santos experienced her breakthrough in 2021 by finishing eighth in the final standings during the 2021 World Championships in Dordrecht. She was also second in the final standings of the 2021–22 World Cup behind Suzanne Schulting due to a third place in Beijing and a win in Nagoya over 1000 meters. In the 1500 meters, she finished fourth in the final standings with a bronze medal over that distance in Beijing. She also qualified for her first Olympics.

References

Living people
1994 births
American female short track speed skaters
Four Continents Short Track Speed Skating Championships medalists
Olympic short track speed skaters of the United States
Short track speed skaters at the 2022 Winter Olympics
Sportspeople from Fairfield, Connecticut
21st-century American women